Events from the year 1839 in Sweden

Incumbents
 Monarch – Charles XIV John

Events

 - The radical novel Det går an by Carl Jonas Love Almqvist is published.
 - Liljeholmens Stearinfabriks AB
 - Stockholms Lyceum

Births
 2 March - Victoria Bundsen, opera alto   (died 1909) 
 18 April - Lotten Edholm, composer and a pioneer within the Swedish Red Cross   (died 1930) 
 21 May - Nils Christoffer Dunér, astronomer (died 1914)
 24 August - Sofie Johannesdotter, serial killer (died 1876)
 2 November  - Augusta Braunerhjelm, playwright  (died 1929) 
 30 December - Victor Hartman, actor  (died 1898) 
 Charlotte Yhlen, doctor  (died 1919)
 Hulda Mellgren, industrialist (died 1918)

Deaths
 7 February  - Karl August Nicander, poet  (born 1799) 
 30 June - Johan Olof Wallin, minister, orator, poet and later Church of Sweden Archbishop of Uppsala  (born 1779) 
 - Jacquette Löwenhielm, royal mistress  (born 1797) 
 - Pär Aron Borg, pioneer in the education for the blind and deaf  (born 1776)

References

 
Years of the 19th century in Sweden
Sweden